Seo Ye-ji is a South Korean actress. She began her acting career in the sitcom Potato Star 2013QR3 (2013–2014). This was followed by major roles in period drama Diary of a Night Watchman (2014), thriller Last (2015), and fantasy Moorim School: Saga of the Brave (2016). Her notable lead roles in television series include Save Me (2017) and Lawless Lawyer (2018). She rose to prominence with the romantic comedy It's Okay to Not Be Okay (2020).

Career

2013–2016: Debut and diverse roles
Seo had no plans to pursue a career in acting but things took a different turn when she caught the attention of the CEO of her then-management company, Made in Chan Entertainment, who persuaded her to venture into acting. In March 2013, she stepped in the entertainment industry by appearing in an advertisement for SK Telecom. In May 2013, she featured in the Samsung Galaxy S4 short film Love essaying the role of Min-joo. She debuted as an actress in the tvN sitcom Potato Star 2013QR3 which aired for 120 episodes from September 23, 2013, to May 15, 2014.

She next starred in the MBC historical drama Diary of a Night Watchman (2014) where she essayed a major role for which she was nominated at the 2014 MBC Drama Awards in the Best New Actress category. This was followed by her appearance in tvN television series Super Daddy Yeol (2015) and notable jTBC television series Last (2015) starring as a civil servant.

After capturing viewers' attention through her drama Last, Seo made her debut on the big screen with the hit historical drama film The Throne (2015) where she played the role of Queen Jeongsun. This was followed by her film Circle of Atonement (2015). She also appeared in the music video of South Korean boy band Big Bang titled "Let's Not Fall In Love" (2015).

In 2016, she played one of the main characters in the KBS drama Moorim School: Saga of the Brave (2016) and marked next big-screen project with the film Seondal: The Man Who Sells the River (2016) in a supporting role. This was followed by supporting role in the KBS drama Hwarang: The Poet Warrior Youth (2016–17).

Following the expiration of her contract with her management company in 2016, Seo left Made in Chan Entertainment and became associated with King Entertainment.

2017–present: Another Way and rising popularity

Starting of 2017 was marked by Seo's first leading role in the film Another Way (2017) which dealt with the issue of suicide pacts. Seo was praised from viewers as 'New Thriller Queen' when she starred in OCN thriller mystery television series Save Me (2017).

She then starred in world's 1st 4DX VR Film Stay With Me (2018) opposite Kim Jung-hyun.
She played a role of lawyer who finds it hard to control her temper in the tvN drama Lawless Lawyer (2018) alongside Lee Joon-gi. The series was a commercial hit and became one of the most highly rated Korean dramas in cable television history. In response to her role, Seo was appointed as an honorary police officer by the National Police Agency.

In 2019, she starred in the films Warning: Do Not Play (2019) and		
By Quantum Physics: A Nightlife Venture (2019).

On January 1, 2020, Seo joined newly established entertainment agency Gold Medalist.

Seo's first venture with her new management company came with tvN and Netflix broadcast romantic comedy It's Okay to Not Be Okay (2020). She starred opposite Kim Soo-hyun and featured in the role of a bestselling children's book author who has a personality disorder. Her portrayal of the character was critically acclaimed by  Manila Bulletin, The Hindu  and The New York Times named the series one of "The Best International Shows of 2020" and called Seo's performance as "mesmerizing". Seo also experienced a substantial rise in popularity and attracted media attention in Korea and internationally.

In 2021, she starred in a mystery-thriller film Recalled, directed by Seo Yoo-min alongside Kim Kang-woo which was a resounding success. Recalled topped local box office on its opening weekend. In December 2021, Seo renewed her contract with the Gold Medalist.

In 2022, Seo starred in the tvN melodrama Eve.

Personal life 
In April 2021, Seo was accused of being the reason behind Kim Jung-hyun's behavior at a 2018 press conference for The Time and his exit from the series. On April 12, South Korean local tabloid Dispatch revealed alleged text messages between Kim Jung-hyun and Seo, which showed the actress demanding Kim to refrain from any physical contact with female actors in the drama The Time. She allegedly told him to get the romantic scenes deleted from the script. He eventually quit in the middle of production citing eating and sleeping disorders.

In response, Seo's agency, Gold Medalist, denied the claim that she was the reason behind Kim's behaviour and abrupt exit from the series. They argued that "it is unreasonable to assume that a lead actor would make a decision that would jeopardize his career without free will", adding that they "confirmed" this with Kim Jung-hyun. The agency argued that messages exchanged between them were "very misleading" and were "merely jealous quarrels about shooting scenes". Amid these allegations, Seo withdrew from the ongoing production of the Korean drama Island. According to the production, her character would be recast and rewritten.

In May 2021, Kim Jung-hyun revealed that he had ended his contract with his agency, whom he accused of forcing the 2018 press conference on him despite his health problems. Kim added that he would pursue legal action against the agency for putting up false claims against him since that event. In addition, Kim also denied Seo has any involvement in how he acted, reiterating the issues on his health problems and company's mistreatment.

Filmography

Film

Television series

Television shows

Music video appearances

Awards and nominations

References

External links 

 

1990 births
Living people
21st-century South Korean actresses
Actresses from Seoul
South Korean television actresses
South Korean film actresses